The Tunnel Thru the Air, Or, Looking Back from 1940 is a science fiction novel written by market forecaster William Delbert Gann in 1927. In the Foreword, Gann hinted that this book is more than just a novel because it "contains a valuable secret, clothed in veiled language. Some will find it the first time they read it, others will see it in the second reading, but the greatest number will find the hidden secret when they read it the third time." Some traders believe Gann has encoded some techniques of financial astrology into this book, and some even claim that they have devoted a lifetime to study this text.

Plot 
The story is roughly divided into two parts: before and after 1927, the year in which it was written. The story began in the late evening of 9 June 1906, when the protagonist Robert Gordon was born. The early part of the book is mostly about the early life of Robert, including how he found and lost his true love, Marie Stanton, who was born on 6 October 1908. The loss of Marie Stanton inspired Robert to become the greatest inventor in history. After 1927, the book describes an imaginary war from April 1930 to July 1932, in which Robert single-handedly help the United States to win with his amazing inventions.

The imaginary war and its hidden meaning

The imaginary war vs. the Great Depression 
Some writers, including W.D.’s grandson John L. Gann, think that the imaginary war in the book was a prediction of the Second World War. However, the war in the book was from 1930 to 1932, whereas the Second World War started about ten years later. Therefore, unless Gann was making a very serious mistake, he could not be referring to it. Since there was no war against the US in 1930 in actual history, some believe that it was Gann’s prediction for the Great Depression in the form of a metaphor. Below is a table comparing the timeline of the imaginary war and the Great Depression:

Transits to the 1776 US independence chart 
Bonnie Hill found that all the turning points of the imaginary war in the book were related to transits to the US chart, mostly by Mars. Hill also noted that Gann was using the Gemini-rising chart of the US Independence, which was also used by other famous astrologers.  (* Note: the transits with Pluto are crossed out below, because it was not yet discovered by 1927 when the book was written.)

Encoding techniques

Title 
Petter Ivar Amundsen believes that the title of the book is an anagram. He replaced the “1940” in the title with the following letters:
 The number “0” is replaced by the letter “O”.
 The remaining numbers 1, 4, 9 are worked in the following ways:
 1 x 9 x 4 = 36, 3 x 6 = 18, and the 18th letter is “R”
 1 & 9 are “19”, and the 19th letter is “S”
 9 + 4 = 13, and the 13th letter is “M”
He rearranged the letters, and the title became “From the Lunar Return, Looking back to His Mother”. Amundsen noted that Marie disappeared on 5 June 1927, when the Moon was in Leo, and she reappeared on 30 August 1932, when the Moon was in Leo again.

He also noted that the date of the Foreword was 9 May 1927, which was 1940 days before the end of the novel, 30 August 1932.

Book cover 
The original 1927 book cover depicts some planes flying around a tunnel in the sky. Paul Nipperess notices that the number and location of planes displays some Fibonacci relationships.

Fake quotes 
There are a number of quotes in the book which are unclear if they are really said or written by the person. For example, on page 191, Gann “quoted” Pythagoras in the following passage: “‘There are in woman’s eyes two sorts of tears, the one of grief; the other of deceit.’ I think that is because there are two kinds of men, one who appreciates love and honor and gives sympathy; the other kind who is selfish, expects something for nothing and must meet with deceit.” Brian Sklenka thinks that Gann was trying to draw the readers’ attention to the Pyathagoras, and the numbers “two” and “one”, indirectly hinting that the octave theory discovered by the Greek philosopher.

Similarly, on page 192, Gann included the following “quote” from Southey, “There are three things a wise man will not trust, the wind, the sunshine of an April day and a woman’s plighted faith.” Again, it is an association of the British poet and the number “three”, which is an indirect reference to his famous story Goldilocks and the Three Bears. Some esoteric writers like S. J. Pasagic believes that the story is a hidden reference to the Law of Three (see the teachings of George Gurdjieff).

Page numbers 
Many believe that Gann used the pages numbers in the 1927 original edition to encode some of his secrets. Here are some examples that the page number is related to the information on that page:

The disappearance of Marie Stanton 
One of the main story line in the novel is that Marie suddenly left Robert in 1927, and she reappeared at the end of the book in 1932. It turns out that all dates related to this incident are related to the positions of Venus, Mars and the Moon:

 Texarkana, June 5, 1927, 3 am. The moment of parting Marie and Robert. The conjunction of Mars and Venus in Cancer, the Moon at the time of the onset of the event in 28 degrees of Cancer. 
 Paris, late February 1929. The illusion of meeting Robert and Marie. The conjunction of Mars and Venus in Cancer on a heliocentric chart. Moon Return on the geo-map. 
 New York, August 30, 1932, 11 am. Meeting Robert and Marie. Lunar return. The connection of Mars and Venus is very close to Cancer.

Weather forecasting along the Mississippi River 
In 1994, retired engineer Bonnie Lee Hill did a public seminar in which she revealed some astrological methods concealed in the Tunnel Thru the Air. Some of the trading rules used by Gann are related to the weather in the area around the Mississippi River, and they are listed below:

The last rule ("Dry Cotton Farmer") was actually not mentioned at all in the book. It was deduced by Hill after she discovered the first two rules. Here are some actual examples from Hill's lecture:

Wet Cotton Farmer (Uranus-Neptune) 
 In 1735, geocentric Uranus opposite Neptune. Over ninety percent of New Orleans was under water. The entire region was drastically affected by the flooding in the Delta.
 In 1762, geocentric Uranus 135° with Neptune. This was a major flood. For instance, the flood level in the city of Cincinnati was up 80 feet. The top of a church steeple was the only thing sticking out of the water in the little town of Cincinnati.
 In 1821 (geocentric Uranus conjunct Neptune), we had another major flood. They called it the “worst flood of the century”. The reporters said that they had no words to describe the damage from this flood. They couldn't even estimate the cost of the damage. People decided give major sections of land back to the Mississippi River. They would not farm the land, and they would not build towns on the land. The people realized that the Mississippi River would always “win”.
 The next flood in the table occurred in 1881 (geocentric Uranus trine Neptune). Please notice that we had a major flood in 1881, and another major flood in 1882. Due to retrogradation, we had the same aspect (geocentric Uranus trine Neptune) on Feb 26, 1881 and April 8, 1882. There are cases in which we had major floods three years in a row because the same aspect occurred in the spring of all three years. The floods in 1881-1882 were very famous. Mark Twain was alive during that time. He actually went down the Mississippi River on a steam boat, and said the Mississippi River was 75 miles wide at that time. The channel of the Mississippi River was 75 miles wide. 
 The next flood in the table occurred in 1907 (geocentric Uranus opposite Neptune). This is the flood mentioned by Gann in The Tunnel Thu the Air. Please notice that we had a flood in 1907, and in 1908. Why? The same aspect occurred in the spring of both years. 
 The next big flood occurred in 1927 (geocentric Uranus 150 Neptune). This is the one that Gann predicts in The Tunnel Thru the Air. They had a late spring and a major flood. There was over $284 million in damage. It was estimated that 240 billion gallons of water came down the Mississippi River that spring. They had 1.8 million acres of land under water. A lot of people feel that this was one of the major causes of the Great Depression; the flood destroyed the economy through the Mississippi basin. This totally destroyed the cotton crops.
 The next major flood occurred in 1935 (geocentric Uranus 135 Neptune). The same aspect occurred in the spring of 1936, and a second flood occurred. The flood in 1936 caused $270 million in damage.
 In 1943, geocentric Uranus trine Neptune. A major flood occurred which caused $172 million in damage. In 1973, we saw geocentric Uranus semi-square Neptune. A major flood caused $420 million of damage. October cotton hit a high price of 99 cents at this time. In 1979, a major flood occurred. Geocentric Uranus was semi-sextile Neptune on March 31, 1979.
 In 1993, geocentric Uranus was conjunct Neptune on February 2. What happened in 1993? The same thing that occurred in 1821, approximately 173 years earlier. Once again, the Mississippi River looks like an inland lake. Many, many acres are under water and they are currently discussing buying the land from the farmers, giving it back to the river, and saying we won't grow crops there again and we won't build buildings there again. The ticket for this flood at the time of the seminar was $12 billion.

Poor Cotton Farmer (Jupiter-Neptune) 
 In 1844, cotton had an extreme low of 5 cents a pound. Geocentric Jupiter was semi-sextile Neptune on April 27, 1844. Since this is rain during the growing season, you will find this class of aspects can happen a little later in the season. It's not required that they be more like January or February. They can be more like March–April.
 On March 2, 1851, geocentric Jupiter was 135 degrees from Neptune. Cotton hit an extreme low of 8.25 cents in January 1852.
 On April 7, 1857, geocentric Jupiter was semi-sextile Neptune. Cotton hit an extreme low of 9.25 cents in January 1858.In 1871, cotton hit the lowest low it had ever hit since 1860 (13.50 cents). 
 On April 8, 1871, geocentric Jupiter was sextile Neptune. In 1873, cotton hit another major low of 13.80. Geocentric Jupiter was trine Neptune on March 3, 1873.
 Cotton hit another major low (6.20 cents) in 1896. Geocentric Jupiter was semi-square Neptune on February 26, 1896.
 Geocentric Jupiter was square Neptune on March 14, 1904. This was a major low in cotton prices. On July 19, cotton sold for 6.85. The cotton farmers were so disgusted that they burned the cotton in the fields. They did not even go to the effort of harvesting it. Hundreds of cotton farmers abandoned their farms and left. It was not worth cotton farming again. No one would ever want cotton ever again. They gave up.
 Very low cotton prices occurred in 1920. Geocentric Jupiter was conjunct Neptune on March 8, 1920.
 On April 17, 1926, geocentric Jupiter was opposite Neptune. In March 1927, cotton hit a low of 11.80. The government reports showed a record crop.
 Cotton hit a major low of 25.20 cents in December 1970. Geocentric Jupiter was semi-sextile Neptune on April 29, 1970.Cotton hit a major low of 26.59 in December 1972. 
 On March 10, 1972, geocentric Jupiter was again semi-sextile Neptune.Cotton hit a major low of 29.99 in July–August 1986. 
 On March 16, 1986, geocentric Jupiter was sextile Neptune.

Dry Cotton Farmer (Saturn-Neptune) 
 In 1761, we had a major drought in the country. Geo Saturn was 135 degrees from Neptune on April 13, 1761. The next year, geo Saturn was again 135 degrees from Neptune on February 6, 1792. We had another major drought in 1762.
 On April 13, 1816, geocentric Saturn was sextile Neptune. There was a major drought and crop failure in 1816.
 On January 14, 1860, geocentric Saturn was inconjunct Neptune. The year 1860 is famous for the Kansas drought. Hundreds of people moved to Kansas tostart over. They planned to start farming, and make a fortune. Many of these farmers gave up and left Kansas after the drought of 1860. They said you just can't make it in Kansas. 
 On March 11, 1863, geocentric Saturn was opposite Neptune. There was a major drought. Cotton hit the highest price it had ever seen 91 cents. That is 91 cents in 1863 dollars. Why was cotton so high? First, there was a major drought. Second, the Civil War was disrupting the economy. 
 On February 1, 1869, geocentric Saturn was trine Neptune. In 1869, cotton hit a high of 35 cents before a huge decline in price.
 On January 31, 1903, geocentric Saturn was inconjunct Neptune. The drought was so severe that cotton farmers planted their crops in a different manner. There was a little bug that grew in certain crops, and the farmers planted those crops next to the cotton. This little bug was called the boll weevil, and it decided that cotton tasted much better than the other crops. Suddenly, the cotton farmers had a major boll weevil infestation. The drought helped to cause a long-term problem with boll weevils.
 A drought occurred in 1910, and on January 24 geocentric Saturn was square Neptune. 
 A drought occurred in 1930, and on December 29, 1929 geocentric Saturn was trine Neptune. 
 Geocentric Saturn was 135 degrees Neptune on February 21, 1931. A drought occurred in 1931.
 The drought in 1933 was the famous Oklahoma Dust Bowl. On February 13, 1933, geo Saturn was inconjunct Neptune.

The Major Motors campaign 
From page 197 to 199, the book described how Robert traded the shares of a company called “Major Motors”. It is in fact an alias for General Motors, just as there is another company in the story called “Major Electric”, which refers to General Electric. Quoting from page 197:

“On Sunday, June 19, 1927, Robert Gordon spent the day studying his charts and working out his cycles for stocks, cotton and grain. He was short of Major Motors and was watching it very closely. On this day he made a new and great discovery of a time factor from which he figured that Major Motors would decline until about June 30th and then start an advance which would last until about September 16th, 1927, when the Company would be 19 years old and at that time the stock would reach final high and would then go down to February to April, 1929. He figured that the stock should advance to around 270 by September 16th and made up his mind to watch it closely and cover his shorts if it went down around June 30th, and then start buying the stock.”

Detailed trades and their astrological aspects 
Bonnie Hill detailed the exact trades and their related astrological aspects as below, including both lunar aspects and transits to the GM incorporation chart on 17 Sep 1908:  (* Note: the transits with Pluto below are crossed out, because it was not yet discovered by 1927 when the book was written.)

Regarding this plethora of astrological aspects, Hill only had the following to comment:
 A major bottom occurs when geocentric Sun is square natal Saturn. 
 Gann sells when geocentric Sun is conjunct the natal Sun, and two planets are at zero South declination. 
Other than that, she did not go further to separate the wheat from the chaff, and delineate how other traders could apply this cluster of seemingly unrelated aspects to their trading.

Relationship to eclipses 
Gann strongly hinted at the astrological influence when he stated that Major Motors’ share price would rise during this period because of “a new and great discovery of a time factor” which would make the price to stop declining “about June 30th”. Daniel Ferrera noted that there was a total solar eclipse on 29th June, 1927, and Saturn was going retrograde. By the middle of September that year, Saturn had turned direct and returned to its spot during the eclipse. Also, this total eclipse fell with the Sun Square to natal Saturn. This is a seemingly very negative aspect, but Ferrera explains that the Natal Saturn was retrograde, and when a planet is retrograde, aspects are reversed that good aspects such as trines and sextiles become negative and bad aspects such as squares & oppositions become positive.

Ferrera also pointed out that, prior to the first trade on 30 Jun 1927, the total lunar eclipse on 15 Jun created some negative transits, because the Moon was in exact opposition to natal Pluto, and the Sun Square to the natal Sun. This is why Gann expected the price to decline into 30 Jun 1927 (except that, of course, Gann could not have been aware of Pluto, as it was discovered in 1930).

Relationship to the Gann angles and the Hexagon chart 
As James Smithson noted, Robert forecasted that Major Motor's share price would rise between June 30 and September 16, 1927 due to positive astrological influences. This is a period of 78 days, during which he forecast that the price would rise from 192½ to 270, which rounds up to 78 points. After a rise of 78 points in 78 days (i.e. 1×1 Gann angle) time and price would be squared and the uptrend would end. Similarly, Daniel Ferrera noted that the bottom price of $192½ is in opposition to Jupiter & Uranus on the Gann Hexagon Chart, whereas the final price of $270 conjoins Jupiter and Uranus on the same chart, a complete 180° movement.

The cotton campaign 
From page 195 to 197, the book goes into details how Robert traded cotton in 1927. Quoting from page 195 of the book: “After Robert had sold out his October cotton at 17.30 and his December cotton at 17.50 on June 10th, he decided to watch the market very closely for a few days because he thought it would go lower. His forecast indicated last buying level around June 25th. He figured that after this time the market would go higher until September 5th to 6th, when he figured it would be final high.”

Relationship to the Wet Cotton Farmer rule 
As indicated in the previous section, Bonnie Hill noted that Uranus was inconjunct with Neptune in that Spring, which would predict that a flood was coming and the cotton price would go up.

Relationship to the Gann angles 
Peter Palaskas found that the support line is related to the 1×1 angle whereas the resistance is related to the 4×1 angle.

Relationship to eclipses 
Peter Palaskas found that the entry dates are related to the two solar eclipses on 3 Jan and 29 Jun 1927.

Declination of major planets 
In addition to the ecliptic longitude, cycles are also found by declination of the planets. On page 79, Gann wrote, “History shows that in 916 agriculture in the British Isles was at its lowest ebb and that there was great scarcity of wheat and corn. Very few people were engaged in tilling the soil on account of wars. The same conditions prevailed 1000 years later in 1916 and 1917, when this country was called on to furnish food to starving Europe and send men and money to save their armies from defeat.” Bonnie Hill explained that the common factor in 916 and 1916 is that geocentric Saturn was at maximum North declination in March. Since Saturn's sidereal year is 29.457 years, it is very uncommon for it to be at maximum North declination in March. Like the weather rules above, the astrological “sign” occurs in the spring.

Also, on page 202, Gann discussed the great bull market from 1924 through 1927, “He went back into the stock market and in the great Coolidge Bull Campaign from 1924 to 1927 was again a dominant factor in General Motors and other stocks and was reputed to have made fifty millions, or more.” Checking the geocentric ephemeris, and Hill found that in March–April 1924, geocentric Jupiter was at max South declination, and geocentric Uranus in South declination during all of 1924. On July 8, 1927 geocentric Jupiter was at 0 North declination, and on May 1, 1927, geocentric Uranus was at 0 North declination. The declination of both planets was “increasing” during the 1924-1927 bull market.

References

External links 
 Full text of The Tunnel Thru the Air at the Internet Archive

1927 American novels
1927 science fiction novels
Fiction set in 1930
Fiction set in 1931
Fiction set in 1932